Fred Sauer (14 December 1886 – 17 September 1952) was an Austrian actor, film director and screenwriter.

Selected filmography

Director
 1920: The Apache Chief (Der Apachenlord)
 1920: The Law of the Desert 
 1920: Demon Blood 
 1921: Monte Carlo
 1922: Youth 
 1922: The Shadows of That Night 
 1922: The Men of Frau Clarissa
 1923: Time Is Money
 1923: The Comedian's Child (Das Komödiantenkind)
 1924: Heart of Stone (Das kalte Herz)
 1925: Frisian Blood
 1925: The Company Worth Millions
 1925: The Ascent of Little Lilian (Aufstieg der kleinen Lilian)
 1926: German Hearts on the German Rhine (Deutsche Herzen am deutschen Rhein)
 1926: Professor Imhof (Wenn das Herz der Jugend spricht)
 1927: The Woman Who Couldn't Say No (Die Frau, die nicht "Nein" sagen kann)
 1927: The Awakening of Woman (Das Erwachen des Weibes)
 1928: Single Mother (Ledige Mütter)
 1928: In Werder the Trees are in Bloom (In Werder blühen die Bäume ...)
 1929: Sweet Pepper (Lockendes Gift)
 1929: The Secret Adversary (Die Abenteurer G.m.b.H.)
 1929: Miss Midshipman (Fräulein Fähnrich)
 1929: Furnished Room (Möblierte Zimmer)
 1930: Dangers of the Engagement Period
 1931: The Stranger (Die Fremde)
 1932: The Pride of Company Three (Der Stolz der 3. Kompanie)
 1934: Hen Pecked Husbands (Der Meisterboxer)
 1934: The Two Seals (Die beiden Seehunde)
 1935: All Because of the Dog (Alles weg’n dem Hund)
 1937: Gordian the Tyrant 
 1937: The Laugh Doctor (Der Lachdoktor)

Writer
 1923: The Comedian's Child (Das Komödiantenkind)
 1925: Tragedy 
 1926: The Woman in Gold (Die Frau in Gold)
 1927: The Awakening of Woman (Das Erwachen des Weibes)
 1928: Love and Thieves (Liebe und Diebe)
 1928: Single Mother (Ledige Mütter)
 1929: Sweet Pepper (Lockendes Gift)
 1937: The Laugh Doctor (Der Lachdoktor)

External links
 
 Fred Sauer at filmportal.de
 Fred Sauer at cyranos.ch

1886 births
1952 deaths
Austrian film directors
German-language film directors
20th-century Austrian screenwriters
20th-century Austrian male writers